It was a fort in the Roman province of Dacia.

See also
List of castra

External links
Roman castra from Romania – Google Maps / Earth

Notes

Preda, Constantin (coord.), Enciclopedia arheologiei şi istoriei vechi a României vol.1, Editura Enciclopedică, București 1994 
Simu, Traian, Drumuri şi cetăţi romane în Banat, Tipografia Naţională, Lugoj 1924

Roman legionary fortresses in Romania
History of Banat
Historic monuments in Caraș-Severin County